The second series of Ross Kemp: Extreme World, a British documentary series, was broadcast on Sky 1 between 9 September and 8 October 2012.

Episodes

Home media
The second series was released on to DVD in region 1 and region 2 on 19 November 2012.

Ratings

References

Ross Kemp: Extreme World
2012 British television seasons